Wissinoming is a neighborhood in the Near Northeast section of Philadelphia. It was the site of locomotive builder Matthias Baldwin's estate "Wissinoming", which was located near Tacony and Van Kirk Streets.  The current Wissinoming is bordered by Mayfair and Tacony on the north, Bridesburg on the south, I-95 and the Delaware River on the east, and Frankford on the west. Wissinoming has two zipcodes 19135 and 19124. Physical boundaries are: The south side of Robbins Street on the north, Cheltenham Avenue on the south, I-95 and the Delaware River on the east, and the east side of Frankford Avenue on the west. Its borders with Frankford and Bridesburg are often disputed, with some pushing the southern boundary further to either Sanger Street or Bridge Street. In addition, its northern border with Tacony is often disputed, with some claiming the border to be as far north as Magee Avenue to as far south as Devereaux Avenue.

Schools
Wissinoming has three public elementary schools: James J. Sullivan Elementary School (located on Ditman Street and Sanger Street), Henry W. Lawton Elementary School (located on Ditman Street and Benner Street), and Mastery Charter School (Smedley), located on Bridge Street. The border of the two schools (Sullivan and Lawton) that decides which school a child attends is Howell Street. Anyone who lives on the west side of Howell Street attends Sullivan, while anyone who lives on the east attends Lawton.

Wissinoming's neighborhood middle school is Harding Middle School located on Torresdale Avenue in the Frankford section of Philadelphia.

Frankford High School is Wissinoming's neighborhood high school, located on Oxford Avenue and Wakeling Street.

Parks
Wissinoming is widely known for its large park, Wissinoming Park. With entrances at Charles Street and Comly Street, Charles Street and Cheltenham Avenue, and Frankford Avenue and Comly Street.

Wissinoming has two playgrounds: Moss Playground (home of the Moss Eagles and located on Torresdale Avenue and Cheltenham Avenue) and American Legion (also known as Devereaux by natives of the neighborhood since it is located on Torresdale Avenue and Devereaux Street).

Police
Philadelphia's 15th Police District (located roughly at Levick Street and Harbison Avenue) covers Wissinoming.

References

External links
Wissinoming history
 

Neighborhoods in Philadelphia
Northeast Philadelphia